The North African Cross Country Championships is an international cross country running competition between the nations of North Africa, organised by the Confederation of African Athletics (CAA). It is typically held over one day in February and features a senior and junior race for both men and women. All four races contain an individual and team competition. Senior short course races were also held during the period where that event was present at the IAAF World Cross Country Championships.

The competition traces its history back to the Maghreb Cross Country Championships organised by the Union des Fédérations d'Athlétisme du Maghreb Uni, and later obtained North African championship status.

It is one of three regional cross country championships organised by the CAA, alongside the East and African Southern Region Cross Country Championships.

Editions

Participation

References

Confederation of African Athletics competitions
Sport in North Africa
Maghreb
Cross country running competitions
Annual sporting events